Punggol, alternatively spelled as Ponggol, is a planning area and new town situated on the Tanjong Punggol peninsula in the North-East Region of Singapore. The town directly borders Sengkang to the south and shares riverine boundaries with the planning area of Seletar to the west and Pasir Ris to the east. Bounding the town to the north and north-east is the Straits of Johor, with Coney Island included as a part of the Punggol planning area.

Under the Punggol 21 initiative, plans to turn the area into a new residential town were announced in 1996 and development of the town started in 1998. Due to the Asian financial crisis in 1997 and the financial troubles within the construction industry in 2003, the plan did not fully materialise. In 2007, a new initiative, the Punggol 21-plus plan, was introduced to redevelop the area into a waterfront town.

Punggol is divided into 11 districts: Canal, Coney Island, Crescent, Matilda, Northshore, Punggol Central, Punggol Field East, Punggol Field West, Punggol Downtown, Punggol Point and Waterway West.

Etymology
Punggol Point or Tanjong Punggol appears as Tanjong Rangon on Franklin and Jackson's 1828 map of Singapore. Punggol, also spelled Ponggol, means "hurling sticks at the branches of fruit trees to bring them down to the ground" in Malay. It could also refer to a place where fruits and forest produce are offered wholesale and carried away. These possible names suggest that Punggol was a fruit-growing district. The place is said to take its name from the river Sungei Ponggol.

Ponggol also means "a stump of a tree", especially "a high stump". There are suggestions that the district's name is based on Tamil (Pongal, "the feast of the boiling rice", celebrated when the sun enters the sign of Capricorn). However, the word Ponggol or Punggol is definitely Malay.

History

Early history

Located in the vicinity of the Punggol Jetty, Punggol was believed to have existed 200 years ago before Sir Stamford Raffles founded Singapore. The Punggol area used to be a well-established rural district dotted with farmhouses and farm structures, which were serviced by roads and dirt tracks. It was one of the oldest settlements in Singapore. The original settlers were predominantly Malays. The early Chinese immigrants, who settled in Punggol from the mid 19th century onwards, were engaged in plantation work, mainly rubber. As the population of the Chinese increased, many Chinese villagers were then engaged in poultry, pig or fish farming, as well as farm produce. The last pig farm closed down in 1990. Hydroponic non-pollutive vegetable farms and orchid farms used to flourish along the Cheng Lim Farmways and Buangkok Farmways, along with old kampongs and low-rise residential areas. Most of these farms have given way to the high-rise HDB flats of Sengkang New Town and Punggol New Town.

Historically, Punggol was populated mostly by Teochews and Catholics. However, the original settlers were predominantly Malays. The end of Upper Serangoon Road is known to Teochews as kangkar or "river bank" or "river mouth". Ferries were used on the Serangoon River as transport. An old market was also located here. The Catholic missionaries arrived here 140 years ago and set up churches and schools. A Malay kampong, which has since been cleared, could also be found at Tanjong Punggol. At the end of Punggol Port Road, Indonesian and Malaysian fishermen auctioned their catch at the wholesale fish market.

World War II
During the Second World War in 1942, about 69 Chinese civilians were massacred by the Japanese military forces at Punggol Point, the northern tip of the area, in what was to be known as the Punggol Beach Massacre as part of the Sook Ching massacre during the Japanese Occupation of Singapore. Today, that location has been marked as a national heritage site, and a war memorial now exists in the area.

Post-war Punggol
In the 1960s, basic amenities like piped water, electricity, paved roads, and drainage systems were introduced through government and self-help programmes. It was also at this time that television became popular and antennas could be seen installed on many kampong rooftops.

Punggol was also known for its sumptuous seafood and boatels that provided services like docking and renting of boats for boating, water skiing and skindiving lessons. These seafood restaurants and boatels have since been relocated in the mid-1990s to facilitate land reclamation works. Poultry and pig farms were also gradually phased out when redevelopment commenced in the 1970s. The last pig farm closed down in 1990. Land vacated by resettled farmers were then tendered out on short-term leases for non-pollutive agricultural activities, which included hydroponic non-pollutive vegetable and orchid farms that used to flourish along the Cheng Lim Farmways and Buangkok Farmways. These farms existed along with old kampongs and low-rise residential areas. Most of these farms have given way to the high-rise HDB flats of Sengkang New Town and Punggol New Town.

Today

Punggol 21

In his National Day Rally speech on 18 August 1996, then-Prime Minister Goh Chok Tong announced the Singapore Government's plan to develop Punggol, known as "Punggol 21". Punggol 21 was a new model for housing, which would feature a new concept in housing as a model for new towns in the 21st century. It would have a mix of private houses and high-grade HDB flats grouped into smaller, distinctly designed estates. Each estate would contain between 1,200 and 2,800 units, with a common neighbourhood green. Every housing unit would be located within 300 metres of the nearest LRT station. Schools, libraries, and community clubs would be clustered for convenience, and there would be three commercial centres, including shopping centres.

A few months after the speech, Punggol 21, which was part of Cheng San Group Representation Constituency then, became an election carrot for the People's Action Party (PAP) to beat a Workers' Party team led by J.B. Jeyaretnam and Tang Liang Hong. At the general election in 1997, the five-man PAP team managed to retain Cheng San GRC with 54.8% of the valid votes.

However, Punggol 21 did not materialise fully as Singapore's economy was affected by the Asian economic crisis in 1997. Although construction began the next year, it was stopped when demand for new flats fell sharply. Plans were again delayed when the construction industry in Singapore experienced financial troubles in 2003. As a result, only some 16,000 flats, out of the 80,000 planned units, have been built as at 2007. There was only one shopping mall in the estate, Punggol Plaza, and there were no recreational facilities like cinemas or swimming pools. As of January 2016, a second shopping mall in the estate, Waterway Point, has opened, and recreational facilities have since been planned within the estate.

Punggol 21-plus

In his National Day Rally speech on 19 August 2007, Prime Minister Lee Hsien Loong offered a new vision for Punggol New Town, and introduced the "Punggol 21-plus" plan to re-vitalise the town.

Under the new plan, Sungei Punggol and Sungei Serangoon, which flank the town, will be dammed up to create a freshwater lake and serve as a reservoir. A 4.2-kilometre long, 20-30-metre wide man-made waterway was planned to run through the estate, linking both rivers. Work on it started in 2009, and was completed on 26 October 2011. When it was built, there will be recreational facilities like water sports for kayaking and canoeing, gardens and parks with jogging and cycling tracks, rooftop gardens, eateries for al fresco dining and a floating island.

The "Punggol 21-plus" project involves 18,000 new HDB and private flats, and about 3,000 new flats will be built in Punggol New Town every year. Punggol New Town is projected to have 96,000 units when fully developed in the long term. Waterfront housing will have stepped courtyards. An integrated waterfront commercial and residential development has also been planned at the town centre, which will be built on both banks of the waterway. The site for this project was put up for sale and named Waterway Point with condominium – Watertown. There will also be other facilities within the town centre, which includes a community club, regional library and hawker centre in the future.

Punggol Central will be converted into a tree-lined boulevard with landscaping. Coney Island, on the other hand, was opened to the public in 2015.

Subzones

Subzones indicated in italics are currently under development

Amenities

Transportation

Prior to 2000s, Punggol Road was the only main road to get to the rest of Singapore.

Urban development into the area has been accelerated with the introduction of better transportational options. The Tampines Expressway (TPE) links Punggol New Town up with Singapore's expressway network. The Kallang-Paya Lebar Expressway, which provides a direct route to the city area via TPE, was fully opened in September 2008. New roads were also built to ease traffic congestion on Punggol Road.

In terms of public transport, the North-East line opened on 20 June 2003, and Punggol Temporary Bus Interchange on 30 November 2003. The Punggol LRT line's east loop commenced operations on 29 January 2005, and the west loop on 29 June 2014, beginning with Nibong, Sumang and Soo Teck stations. An additional station on the North East line, Punggol Coast, will commence operations in 2024, serving commuters in Punggol North.

Commercial facilities
Punggol Plaza

Strategically located near Coral Edge LRT station, Punggol Plaza is the first shopping mall in Punggol New Town. Opened in September 2004, it offers residents the convenience of fulfilling all their marketing needs at one place, with an NTUC FairPrice supermarket located on the third floor of the plaza and a food court operated by Koufu on the ground floor. Free shuttle services between Punggol Plaza and Sengkang New Town have been provided since September 2004.

Waterway Point

Located beside the Punggol Waterway and Punggol MRT/LRT station, Waterway Point is the largest mall located in Punggol New Town. It is integrated with a town square and a visitors' centre which provides an avenue for residents and the public to learn more about the heritage of Punggol through exhibitions and civic and community events and also features the first underground and largest suburban cineplex in Singapore. The mall had a soft launch on 18 January 2016, and was officially opened on 19 April that year.

Oasis Terraces

Oasis Terraces was announced in October 2015 by the Housing and Development Board (HDB) as part of two new neighbourhood centres in Punggol next to Oasis LRT station, the other one being Northshore Plaza. Oasis Terraces also houses the Punggol Polyclinic which opened on 24 November 2017, offering outpatient medical care, X-ray, physiotherapy, podiatry services and women health services such as screening for cervical and breast cancer. The mall opened on 15 June 2018.

Northshore Plaza I & II
Northshore Plaza I & II are twin shopping malls built as a part of the new-generation neighbourhood centres by HDB; like Oasis Terraces. Northshore Plaza I opened on 29 October 2021; located at Northshore District next to Samudera LRT station and linked to Northshore Plaza 2 via a linkbridge across Northshore Drive, whereas Northshore Plaza 2 opened on 21 January 2022.

Recreational facilities

Punggol Waterway Park

Punggol Waterway Park is a riverine park located along the Punggol Waterway. Opened on 23 October 2011, the park is designed with four themes to cater to residents of all ages. It also provides residents opportunities for leisure activities such as jogging and cycling which can be carried out along the promenade at both sides of the waterway.

SAFRA Punggol Clubhouse
Located near Punggol Waterway Park beside Sam Kee LRT station on the Punggol LRT West Loop, the SAFRA Punggol Clubhouse is a five-storey recreational facility. Announced to be built in June 2014, the clubhouse caters to mainly NSmen and their families features an indoor water playground and a large eco-themed childcare centre. Completed in 2016, the clubhouse houses 10 F&B outlets such as themed restaurants, alfresco dining and quick-service outlets. Its other amenities includes a gym, bowling alley and a karaoke outlet. Punggol Safra was officially opened on 24 April 2016.

Punggol Regional Sports Centre
Punggol Regional Sports Centre was announced in 2018. It was mentioned in Vision 2030 and will open in 2023.

One Punggol
One Punggol was announced in 2018 as Punggol Town Hub, it will be an integrated community facility like Our Tampines Hub. The development took its present name in 2021. The Punggol Town Hub is expected to be completed by mid-2022. It includes Punggol Regional Library, a Community Club and a new hawker centre.

Marina Country Club
The boat club has a childcare, restaurant, pub and fishing & prawning pools. It used to be only connected with a small road from Punggol Seventeenth Avenue. Presently, it is accessible by Northshore Walk and bus service 384.

Religious institutions

Masjid Al Islah

Masjid Al Islah is located within the densely populated Punggol New Town at 30 Punggol Field. The mosque serves the Muslim community in Punggol.

Church of the Transfiguration
The Church of the Transfiguration is the latest Catholic church to be built in Singapore and will serve an estimated 15,000 Catholics and is expected to be one of the largest parishes in Singapore.

Fo Guang Shan (Singapore) 
Fo Guang Shan (Singapore) is located at Punggol Place and opened in October 2007. The Temple building comprises the main shrine hall, a visitor centre, a dining room, a hall for sutra manuscripts, a columbarium, multi-purpose classrooms, a teahouse, an open-air terrace, car park and other modern facilities.

Punggol Joint Temple
Punggol Joint Temple is a combined temple built in 2007 and is located along Tebing Lane. The temple complex houses three constituent temples, which are Sheng Jia Temple, Tian Jun Temple and Tian Ci Gong (Society of Love & Compassion). Sheng Jia Temple's main deity is the Monkey God and has a long history of more than 40 years. All of their temple workers work voluntarily and on a free-will basis.

Educational institutions
There are currently eleven primary schools and four secondary schools in Punggol New Town.

Primary schools

 Edgefield Primary School (育德小学) originally opened in January 2001 but could not attract enough students to make even one class. It opened in January 2002.
Greendale Primary School (绿苑小学), was one of the six new primary schools built in new housing estates and towns so as to cater to smaller class size.
Horizon Primary School opened in 2010.
 Mee Toh School (弥陀学校) moved from Race Course Road to Punggol New Town in January 2005.
Northshore Primary School opened in 2021.
Oasis Primary School opened in 2016 along with Punggol Cove and Waterway Primary Schools.
Punggol Cove Primary School opened in 2016 along with Oasis and Waterway Primary Schools.
Punggol Green Primary School opened in 2013 to serve the Punggol West community. It is located at 98 Punggol Walk, next to Punggol Sapphire and Punggol Ripples.
Punggol View Primary School, opened in 2013, operating as a single-session school so as to commit more space and time for holistic education.
Waterway Primary School opened in 2016 along with Oasis and Punggol Cove Primary Schools.
 Valour Primary School opened in 2020.
Secondary schools
Edgefield Secondary School opened in 2011.
 Greendale Secondary School opened in January 2006.
Punggol Secondary School opened in 2000.
Yusof Ishak Secondary School moved from Bukit Batok to Punggol New Town in 2022.

Tertiary institutions

Singapore Institute of Technology (under development). On 23 August 2015, Singapore's Prime Minister Lee Hsien Loong announced in his National Day Rally that SIT will have a new centralised campus in Punggol. The university will be integrated with a creative industry cluster to be built by JTC Corporation, and into Punggol Downtown and the Housing Board's upcoming Northshore district.

International schools
Global Indian International School

References

Bibliography

External links

 Pasir Ris-Punggol Town Council
 Pasir Ris-Punggol GRC Town Portal
 Punggol History and Community updates
 Punggol News

 
Places in Singapore
North-East Region, Singapore